Andrius Puotkalis (born 6 October 1980) is a Lithuanian professional footballer. He was playing the position of midfielder and is 1.84 m tall. He is a former member of the Lithuania national football team.

External links
 

1980 births
Living people
FK Atlantas players
FBK Kaunas footballers
Lithuanian footballers
Lithuania international footballers
FK Kareda Kaunas players
Association football midfielders
FK Žalgiris players
FK Inkaras Kaunas players